The Western Australia state soccer team is a team representing the Australian state of Western Australia. The state team is currently administered by Football West.

History
The team first played in 1902 against the England Cricket Team.

Results

Pre World War 2

1940s and 1950s

1960s

Merdeka Cup Tournament

Western Australia competed in the Pestabola Merdeka four times between 1967 and 1970. The state's best performance in the tournament was third in 1968.

Marah Halim Cup Football Tournament

Western Australia competed in the Marah Halim Cup Football Tournament 3 times between 1975 and 1977, and were champions in 1975 and 1976.

1970s

1980s

1990s

2000s

2010s

2020s

Women's State Team

Notes

References

Soccer in Western Australia